HDSB may refer to:
Halton District School Board, in Ontario, Canada
Holmes District School Board, in Florida, United States